Chionata is a village and a community in the southeastern part of the island of Cephalonia, Greece. It is situated in the plain between the southeastern slope of Mount Ainos and the Ionian Sea coast. Its population in 2011 was 63 for the village and 154 for the community, which includes the villages Kolaitis (pop. 32) and Thiramonas (pop. 59). It was devastated by the 1953 Ionian earthquake.

Population

See also

List of settlements in Cephalonia

External links
Chionata at the GTP Travel Pages

References

Populated places in Cephalonia
Eleios-Pronnoi